Musseromys is a genus of rodent, in the family Muridae, endemic to the Philippines. Four species are known, all from Luzon:

Musseromys anacuao - Sierra Madre tree-mouse
Musseromys beneficus - Mount Pulag tree-mouse
Musseromys gulantang - Banahaw tree-mouse
Musseromys inopinatus - Amuyao tree-mouse

Description 

All members of the genus are small murids weighing between 15 and 22 grams. They have tails (82 - 101 mm) usually longer than the rest of their bodies (74 - 84 mm).

References

 
Rodents of the Philippines
Rodent genera
Endemic fauna of the Philippines